The Great Canadian Shoreline Cleanup is a conservation initiative of the Ocean Wise Conservation Association and WWF-Canada. The Shoreline Cleanup
encourages people across Canada to remove shoreline litter to help create healthy waters for everyone, including the wildlife and communities that depend on them.

The Great Canadian Shoreline Cleanup is one of the largest direction action conservation programs in Canada and is a contributor to the International Coastal Cleanup. The Ocean Conservancy's International Coastal Cleanup is the world's largest volunteer effort for ocean health. It engages people to remove trash and debris from the world's beaches and waterways, identify the sources of debris, and change the behaviors that cause marine debris in the first place.

Volunteers and sponsors collect and catalogue litter which is then collected for analysis on sources of garbage that enter the ocean.

History
In 1994, a small group of employees and volunteers at the Vancouver Aquarium decided to protect the shorelines of Vancouver by cleaning up the shorelines of Stanley Park, and submitted data collected from their cleanup to the International Coastal Cleanup. By 1997, the project became known as the Great BC Beach Cleanup and with 400 volunteers cleaning and collecting data from 20 sites across the Lower Mainland annually. As the program continue to expand, cleanup locations started to pop-up in the interior of BC highlight the connection between inland bodies of water, such as rivers and lakes, to the ocean. In 2001, the initiative expanded into Alberta and became known as the Great Canadian Shoreline Cleanup. By 2003, cleanups were happening in every province and territory of Canada as part of the Great Canadian Shoreline Cleanup.

Every year, organizations in select cities host larger events where community members can drop in to clean a local shoreline, some of these cities include, Vancouver, Calgary, Edmonton, Toronto, Montreal, Quebec City and Halifax. Every participating cleanup submits information on what items are collected, how many items of each are collected and what animals or aquatic life is found affected by marine debris (i.e. entangled or dead). This data is compiled and then sent to The Ocean Conservancy. With this information, reports are produced examining the impacts of marine debris on the environment; for example, Marine Debris: A Focus for Community Engagement, a report by Paul Topping presented at the Coastal Zone Canada Conference in 2000.

Overview
The Great Canadian Shoreline Cleanup is one of the largest conservation initiatives of the  Vancouver Aquarium. While coordinated out of Vancouver, BC and Toronto, Ontario, the program reaches into every province and territory of Canada. In 2011, over 56,000 registrants signed up to clean 1,665 sites along the shores of Canada.

This initiative is part of The Ocean Conservancy's International Coastal Cleanup, an international program encouraging community members to remove litter from their shorelines. "The event focuses on educating and empowering people to become a part of the marine debris solution.".  Canada is one of at least 120 countries worldwide participating in this program, others include: Australia, the United States, Mexico, Singapore, Fiji, Kuwait, Peru, China, Jamaica, Barbados, France and the United Kingdom. Currently, the Great Canadian Shoreline Cleanup is one of the largest cleanup programs in the world.

The Great Canadian Shoreline Cleanup submits a tally of the data collected from each individual site to the International Coastal Conservancy every year.

Some quick statistics on the Great Canadian Shoreline Cleanup for the last few years:

How it works
Powered by Canadians, this program allows people from all regions and all walks of life to make a positive difference to their environment. Since 2003, more than 180,000 Canadians registered to clean up just 6,807 km of shorelines. Together, they have removed 365,427 kg of litter from Canada's shorelines. Participants are encouraged to register to clean up a specific site in advance, but some Site Coordinators have left their events open to people wanting to drop in to participate.

Year-round staff work out of the Vancouver Aquarium in Stanley Park and a satellite office in Toronto, Ontario. Participants can choose from a past list of shoreline sites or they can add a new shoreline to the database. Eligible shorelines are areas where land meets water, which include but are not limited to oceans, rivers, lakes, streams, ponds and wetlands.

The program typically runs the third week every September; early registration is highly recommended as preferred shoreline sites are usually claimed by returning Site Coordinators early. Registration to be a Site Coordinator runs from Spring until September. Participants wanting to join a cleanup are welcome to register up until the day of the event.

With the support of Year of Science, the Vancouver Foundation and SAP Canada, the Great Canadian Shoreline Cleanup piloted spring shoreline cleanups in May 2011 only for schools in BC. These spring cleanups provided educators the opportunity to facilitate cleanups to complement new lesson plans developed by the Vancouver Aquarium. These lesson plans support the Prescribed Learning Outcomes of the BC Ministry of Education's Integrated Resource Packages (IRPs).

In 2012, this Spring Educational Program is expanding into Ontario, with an additional curriculum guide containing lesson plans developed for schools in Ontario. A Youth Site Coordinator Manual has also been developed to help secondary students gain valuable skills in teamwork, promotions, event planning and leadership while organizing a shoreline cleanup. All educational resources are made available free of charge.

Origins of shoreline litter
Data results over the years have indicated that the majority of litter removed from shorelines in Canada originates from land and land-based activities. In 2011, of the nearly 963,000 items removed from shorelines, approximately 50.6% were identified as originating from shoreline and recreational activities, while another 40.7% originated from smoking-related activities.

Shoreline litter can become aquatic litter and marine debris. Marine debris is a major pollution problem affecting every waterway.

Items found along the shoreline
A cleanup of any shoreline will reveal some unexpected discoveries. Over the years, participants have hauled out stolen cars, motorcycles, and hotel safes, as well as innumerable bikes, mattresses, couches and computer equipment. Some items suggest people have a romantic affiliation with the shoreline, and some items suggest that the romance is over (burned engagement ring boxes, engagement rings, torn-up letters, etc.).

All across the country, Canadians have found some unusual items along their shorelines. Some of the more unusual items include a hair curler, Celine Dion CDs, a rickshaw, messages in bottles, a rice cooker, a love letter, a whoopee cushion, false teeth, a disco ball, wedding veils, a wedding gown, wedding invitations and a groom's jacket, barbecues, toilets, patio furniture, auto parts, an Elvis suit, a canoe made out of duct tape and a kitchen sink.

While a variety of strange items are found every year, the more common items collected from shorelines continue to be found in abundance annually. Every year, cigarette butts top the list of finds in Canada, and around the world. In 2009 alone, this conservation program removed 367,010 cigarette butts from shorelines across Canada. The majority of shoreline litter originates from two sources: shoreline and recreational activities and smoking-related activities.

The 2011 Dirty Dozen

See also 
 Earth Day
 National Cleanup Day
 Ocean Conservancy
 Vancouver Aquarium
 World Cleanup Day
 WWF-Canada

External links 
Great Canadian Shoreline Cleanup home page
Clean Up Australia
 California Coastal Cleanup
 International Coastal Cleanup
National CleanUp Day
World CleanUp Day

References

Nature conservation organizations based in Canada